Armstrong County is the name of two counties in the United States:
Armstrong County, Pennsylvania 
Armstrong County, Texas

It is also the name of a former county:
Armstrong County, South Dakota